Holzkirchen station is a railway station on the Munich S-Bahn in the district of Holzkirchen in Upper Bavaria, Germany. It is served by the S-Bahn line  and Bayerische Regiobahn.

Location
Holzkirchen station is a junction station where the Munich–Holzkirchen railway, Mangfall Valley Railway (to Rosenheim), Holzkirchen–Lenggries railway and Holzkirchen–Schliersee railway join together.

History
Holzkirchen station was opened on 31 October 1857 together with the section Großhesselohe-Rosenheim the Bavarian Maximilian Railway. The entire Maximilian Railway Ulm-Munich-Salzburg was completed on 1 August 1860. On 23 November 1861 a route to Miesbach was opened so that Holzkirchen became a railway junction. In 1862, the Munich–Holzkirchen railway was double-tracked due to the increasing volume of traffic. In 1868 the Holzkirchen-Miesbach line was extended to Hausham and in 1869 to Schliersee. On 15 October 1871, the Munich–Rosenheim railway (Munich-Grafing-Rosenheim) was opened, which made the previous detour of the Maximilian Railway over Holzkirchen unnecessary. Since most of the trains went via Grafing, the Bavarian Maximilian Railway and the Holzkirchen station lost their traffic.

On 1 June 1874 another outgoing line from Holzkirchen route to Bad Tölz was opened.

On 24 November 2009, there was a motor fire in an  train of the Bayerische Oberlandbahn.

Gallery

References

Munich S-Bahn stations
Railway stations in Bavaria
Railway stations in Germany opened in 1857
1857 establishments in Bavaria
Miesbach (district)